The 1910 Richmond Spiders football team was an American football team that represented Richmond College—now known as the University of Richmond—as a member of the Eastern Virginia Intercollegiate Athletic Association (EVIAA) during the 1910 college football season. Led by E. V. Long  in his first and only year as head coach, Richmond finished the season 1–6–1.

Schedule

References

Richmond
Richmond Spiders football seasons
Richmond Spiders football